The Knights of Saint Mulumba were founded in Onitsha, Anambra, Nigeria on 14 June 1953 with name THE ORDER OF THE KNIGHT OF BLESSED MULUMBA. It was founded on the principle of Catholic Action and modelled after the sacred Order of Catholic Knighthood. Currently, there are over 10,772 members. The Supreme Knight of the order is Sir. Diamond Ovueraye, a 4th Degree knight; the highest degree in the Order.

External links
Knights of Saint Mulumba

Saint Mulumba
Christian organizations established in 1953
1953 establishments in Nigeria